Roberto Gödeken is a Surinamese football manager.

Career
Since October 2013 he coached the Suriname national football team. He is also coaching  SV Nishan 42. In 2015, he got put aside as interim coach and was replaced by Dean Gorré. In February 2016 he became coach once again of Suriname.

References

External links
 Roberto Gödeken at National-Football-Teams.com
 

Year of birth missing (living people)
Living people
Surinamese football managers
Sportspeople from Paramaribo
S.V. Robinhood managers
SVB Eerste Divisie managers
Suriname national football team managers